A Radiant Girl is a 2021 French drama film written and directed by Sandrine Kiberlain in her feature directorial debut. The film stars Rebecca Marder as a young Jewish girl aspiring to become an actress during the occupation of France. The film premiered in the International Critics' Week section of the 2021 Cannes Film Festival, where it competed for the Caméra d'Or.

Premise 
In 1942, 19-year-old Irène is a young Jewish girl living in Paris. She has a passion for theatre and dreams of becoming an actress. Irène rehearses Marivaux's L'Épreuve to prepare for an entrance exam to the conservatory.

Cast 
 Rebecca Marder as Irène
 André Marcon as André, Irène's father
 Anthony Bajon as Igor, Irène's brother
 India Hair as Viviane, Irène's friend
 Françoise Widhoff as Marceline, Irène's grandmother
 Florence Viala as Josiane, a neighbor
 Ben Attal as Jo
 Cyril Metzger as Jacques
 Jean Chevalier as Gilbert

Production 
In May 2017, Sandrine Kiberlain revealed in an interview with Elle magazine that she would be preparing her first feature film and that it was be a long-term project, which would require a lot of time and work. In an interview with Gala magazine, Kiberlain called the film "extremely personal" and explained, "I had the story in me for ten years, and it took me a long year to write it, alone."

Filming began on 17 July 2020 in the 8th arrondissement of Paris, for a period of 5 weeks. Filming concluded in August 2020 in Vexin, which included shots at Nesles-la-Vallée on the Sausseron river, as well as a road between Hédouville and Ronquerolles in the Val-d'Oise department.

Release 

The film was selected as a special screening in the International Critics' Week section at the 2021 Cannes Film Festival, where it had its world premiere on 8 July 2021. It had its theatrical release in France through Ad Vitam Distribution on 26 January 2022.

Reception

Critical response 
On Rotten Tomatoes, the film holds an approval rating of 91% based on 11 reviews, with an average rating of 7.00/10.

Jonathan Romney of Screen Daily praised the "highly appealing effusiveness" of Marder's performance but criticized Kiberlain's stylistic choices and the film's "heavy-handed" conclusion: "A Radiant Girl is highly theatrical [...] in its emphasis on the nature of stage performance – which often gets the film bogged down in backstage discussion of a sort that can too easily feel alienating to film audiences. This only adds to the awkwardness of a film that - especially in its treatment of one of the gravest topics in modern French history - ultimately feels as callow as its heroine."

Awards and nominations

References

External links 
 
 
 

2021 films
2021 directorial debut films
2021 drama films
French historical drama films
2020s French films
2020s French-language films
2020s historical drama films
Films shot in Paris
Films shot in Val-d'Oise
Films set in Paris
Films set in 1942
Films about actors
Films about theatre
Films about Jews and Judaism